Ilocos Region is an administrative region of the Philippines, designated as Region I, occupying the northwestern section of Luzon and part of Central Luzon plain, primarily by Pangasinan. It is bordered by the Cordillera Administrative Region to the east, the Cagayan Valley to the northeast and southeast, and the Central Luzon to the south. To the west lies the South China Sea.

The region comprises four provinces (Ilocos Norte, Ilocos Sur, La Union and Pangasinan) and one independent city (Dagupan). Its regional center is San Fernando, La Union whereas the largest settlement is San Carlos City, Pangasinan. The 2000 Census reported that the major languages spoken in the region are Ilocano at 64% of the total population at that time, Pangasinan with 32.5%, and Tagalog and other languages with 3.21%.

History

Prehistory 
The region was first inhabited by the aboriginal Negritos, before they were pushed by successive waves of Austronesian immigrants that penetrated the narrow coast. Tingguians (Igorot) in the interior, Ilocanos in the north, Pangasinenses in the south, and Zambals in the southwesternmost areas settled the region.

Early history 
As commercial trading routes became established in Southeast Asia, the pre-Hispanic Luyag na Caboloan (present-day Pangasinan) area in the vicinity of Lingayen gulf became maritime trading centers, as gold mined from the Cordillera Mountain Range came down along the Aringay-Tonglo-Balatok gold trail, and was also traded in the neighboring settlement of Agoo, whose coast at the time was shaped in such a way that it was a good harbor for foreign vessels.

Evidence of trade between the then-Pangasinense port of Agoo and China has been excavated in the form of porcelain and pottery pieces unearthed at the site of the Catholic church during its renovation, - which are now kept in the Museo de Iloko. Japanese fishermen eventually established their first settlement in the Philippines there, passing on their fishing skills and technologies to the local populace.

Spanish colonial era 
The Spanish arrived in the 16th century and established Christian missions and governmental institutions to control the native population and convert them to Catholicism. Present-day Vigan in Ilocos Sur province became the diocesan seat of Nueva Segovia. Ilocanos in the northern parts were less easily swayed, however, and remained an area filled with deep resentments against Spain. These resentments surfaced at various points in the Ilocos provinces' history as insurrections, most notably that of Andres Malong and Palaris of Pangasinan, Diego Silang and his wife Gabriela Silang in 1764, and the Basi Revolt in the 19th century. However, it was the Pangasinans in the south who were the last to stand against the Spaniards.

American colonial era and World War II 
In 1901, the region came under American colonial rule, and in 1941, under Japanese occupation.

During 1945, the combined American and the Philippine Commonwealth troops including with the Ilocano and Pangasinan guerillas liberated the Ilocos Region from Japanese forces during the Second World War.

Post-independence period 
Several presidents of the Republic of the Philippines hailed from the Region: Elpidio Quirino, Ferdinand Marcos, and Fidel V. Ramos. The province of Pangasinan was transferred by Ferdinand Marcos from Region III into Region I in 1973 and afterwards imposed a migration policy for Ilokanos into Pangasinan, to the moderate detriment of the native Pangasinenses. Before the administration of Ferdinand Marcos, Pangasinan was not a part of the region. He also included Abra, Mountain Province, and Benguet in the Ilocos region in a bid to expand Ilokano influence among the ethnic peoples of the Cordilleras.

Martial law era 
Various human rights violations were documented in the Ilocos region during the Marcos martial law era, despite public perception that the region was supportive of Marcos' administration. In Ilocos Norte, various farmers from the towns of Vintar, Dumalneg, Solsona, Marcos, and Piddig were documented to have been tortured, and eight farmers in Bangui and three indigenous community members in Vintar were "salvaged" in 1984.

Ilocanos who were critical of Marcos' authoritarian rule included Roman Catholic Archbishop and Agoo, La Union native Antonio L. Mabutas, who spoke actively against the torture and killings of church workers. Other La Union natives who fought the dictatorship were student activists student activists Romulo and Armando Palabay of San Fernando, La Union, whose torture and death in a military camp in Pampanga would lead them to being honored as martyrs in the fight against the dictatorship in the Philippines' Bantayog ng mga Bayani memorial.

In Ilocos Norte, one of the prominent victims of the Martial Law era who came from Laoag was Catholic layperson and social worker Purificacion Pedro, who volunteered in organizations protesting the Chico River Dam Project in the nearby Cordillera Central mountains. Wounded while visiting activist friends in Bataan, she was later killed by Marcos administration soldiers while recuperating in the hospital. Another prominent opponent of the martial law regime was human rights advocate and Bombo Radyo Laoag program host David Bueno, who worked with the Free Legal Assistance Group in Ilocos Norte  during the later part of the Marcos administration and the early part of the succeeding Aquino administration. He would later be assassinated by motorcycle-riding men in fatigue uniforms on October 22, 1987 – part of a wave of assassinations which coincided with the 1986-87 coup d'état which tried to unseat the democratic government set up after the 1986 People Power Revolution. Both Bueno and Pedro were later honored among the first 65 people to have their names inscribed on the wall of remembrance of the Philippines' Bantayog ng mga Bayani, which honors the martyrs and heroes who fought the dictatorship, and Pedro was listed among Filipino Catholics nominated to be named Servant of God.

Transfer of provinces to the Cordillera Administrative Region 
When the Cordillera Administrative Region was established under Corazon Aquino, the indigenous provinces of Abra, Mountain Province, and Benguet were transferred into the newly formed region.

Geography 

The Ilocos Region is divided into two contrasting geographical features. The Ilocos provinces occupy the narrow plain between the Cordillera Central mountain range and the South China Sea, whereas Pangasinan occupies the northwestern portion of the vast Central Luzon plain, having Zambales Mountains as its natural western limit.

Lingayen Gulf is the most notable body of water in Pangasinan and it contains several islands, including the Hundred Islands National Park. To the north of Ilocos is Luzon Strait.

The Agno River runs through Pangasinan from Benguet, flowing into a broad delta at the vicinities of Lingayen and Dagupan before emptying into Lingayen Gulf.

Administrative divisions 
The Ilocos Region comprises 4 provinces, 1 independent component city, 8 component cities, 116 municipalities, and 3,265 barangays.

Provinces

Governors and vice governors

Cities and municipalities

Economy 

Although the economy in the southern portion of the region, especially Pangasinan, is anchored on agro-industrial and service industry, the economy in the northern portion of the region is anchored in the agricultural sector. The economy in Pangasinan is driven by agro-industrial businesses , such as milkfish (bangus) cultivation and processing, livestock raising, fish paste processing (bagoong), and others. Income in the Ilocos provinces or northern portion mostly come from cultivating rice, tobacco, corn, sugarcane, and fruits; raising livestock such as pigs, chicken, goats, and carabaos (water buffalos).

The distribution of the economic activity in the region may be seen from the collection of tax revenue of the national government. The bulk of the collections come from Pangasinan, which posted 61% of the total.

The service and light manufacturing industries are concentrated in the cities. Dagupan, a major financial, commercial and educational hub in the north, is mostly driven by its local entrepreneurs, which have expanded its network up to the national level such as the CSI Group, Magic Group, BHF Group of companies, Guanzon Group, St Joseph Drugs, and Siapno-Tada Optical, among others. San Fernando in La Union also has an international shipping port and the upgraded San Fernando Airport. While Laoag in Ilocos Norte has an international airport.

The tourism industry, driven by local airlines and land transportation firms in the area like Pangasinan Solid North Bus, Dagupan Bus Company, Farinas Transit Company and Partas, focuses on the coastal beaches and on eco-tourism. There are fine sands stretching along Lingayen Gulf area notably the historic Tondaligan Beach in Dagupan and the rest of the region.

The region is also rich in crafts, with renowned blanket-weaving and pottery.  The Ilocanos' burnay pottery is well known for its dark colored clay.

Demographics 

The Ilocos provinces are the historical homeland of the Ilocanos. In the 2000 Census, the Ilocanos comprised 64% of the region, Pangasinan people 32.5%, and the Tagalogs 3%.

Pangasinan is the historical homeland of the Pangasinans. The population of Pangasinan comprises approximately 60% of the total population of the region. The Ilocanos started migrating to Pangasinan in the 19th century. Pangasinan was formerly a province of Region III (Central Luzon) before President Marcos signed Presidential Decree No. 1, 1972, incorporating it into Region I.  Minority groups include the Tingguian and Isneg communities that inhabit the foothills of the Cordillera mountains.

The population is predominantly Roman Catholic with strong adherents of Protestantism such as the Aglipayan denomination further north of the country. There are also adherents to other religions, such as Iglesia ni Cristo, Mormons, and the like. There is also an undercurrent of traditional animistic beliefs especially in rural areas. The small mercantile Chinese and Indian communities are primarily Buddhists, Taoists, and Hindus.

Culture and the arts 

The Ilocos region is noted for its distinctive culture, shaped by the austere demands of its geography.

The region has given birth to numerous artists who have won national acclaim - among the most notable being writer and activist Isabelo de los Reyes of Vigan who helped publish the earliest currently-extant text of Biag ni Lam-Ang;  Badoc-born Philippine Revolution era activist and leader Juan Luna; and Binalonan-born Carlos Bulosan, whose novel America is in the Heart has become regarded as "[t]he premier text of the Filipino-American experience."

The region is also home to several National Artists of the Philippines, including National Artist for Theater Severino Montano who was conferred the honor in 2001, and National Artist for Dance Lucrecia Kasilag, who was conferred the honor in 1989.

Notable people 

 Elpidio Quirino, sixth President of the Philippines
 Ferdinand Marcos, tenth President of the Philippines
 Fidel V. Ramos, twelfth President of the Philippines, from Pangasinan 
 Bongbong Marcos, seventeenth President of the Philippines
 Gregorio Aglipay, founder of the Aglipayan Church, he is from Batac, Ilocos Norte
 Manuel Arguilla, writer, patriot, and martyr during the Japanese occupation
 Salvador Bernal, his output included over 300 productions in art, film and music, and earned him the award of National Artist for Theater and Design in 2003, from Dagupan
 Gloria Diaz, Philippines- first Miss Universe from Aringay, La Union
 Victorio Edades, Father of Modern Philippine Painting. A National Artist awardee for Visual Arts (Painting) He hailed from Dagupan
 Josefa Llanes Escoda, founder of Girl Scouts of the Philippines, from Dingras, Ilocos Norte.
 Lucrecia Roces Kasilag – National Artist of the Philippines for Music, from San Ferndando, La Union
 Juan Luna, famous Filipino painter of the Spoliarium from Badoc, Ilocos Norte
 Antonio Luna, army general who fought in the Philippine–American War, He is from Badoc, Ilocos Norte.
 Antonio Mabutas – Agoo-born first bishop of Diocese of Laoag and the second Archbishop of the Archdiocese of Davao, historically noted as the first Roman Catholic Archbishop to write a pastoral letter to criticize human rights violations under the Marcos dictatorship.
 Bienvenido Nebres – Bacnotan-raised academic, National Scientist of the Philippines for Mathematics, former Provincial Superior of the Society of Jesus in the Philippines
Armando "Mandrake" Ducusin Palabay - Filipino student leader and activist from San Fernando La Union, honored at the Philippines' Bantayog ng mga Bayani as a martyr of the resistance against the Marcos dictatorship.
 Orlando Quevedo, cardinal and third Archbishop of the Archdiocese of Cotabato. First cardinal from Mindanao.  He is from Sarrat, Ilocos Norte.
 Artemio Ricarte, Filipino general during the Philippine Revolution and the Philippine–American War
 Diego Silang, male revolutionary leader during the Spanish Occupation
 Gabriela Silang, female revolutionary leader during the Spanish Occupation
 Teofilo Yldefonso, The first Filipino and Southeast Asian to win an Olympic medal and the only male Filipino olympian to win multiple medals. He is from Piddig, Ilocos Norte.

See also 
 Amburayan
 Ilocos
 Solid North

References

External links 
 
 
 

 
Regions of the Philippines
Luzon